is a Japanese singer and vocalist. She became the singer of one of the Kirby games Albums: Hoshi no Kirby - Story of the Fountain of Dreams. It was officially released on the Kirby's Adventure soundtrack CD in Japan. It contains eight songs with actual lyrics sung to Kirby tunes. The rest of the CD is the actual game music, totaling 37 tracks and all.

External links 
 Gametrax - Lists of Hoshi no Kirby - Story of the Fountain of Dreams soundtracks at Gametrax
 Kirby's Rainbow Resort Music Soundtracks - Lists of Hoshi no Kirby - Story of the Fountain of Dreams Soundtracks at Kirby's Rainbow Resort
 Chudah's Corner - Lists of Kirby - Story of the Fountain of Dreams Soundtracks and also has total of 37 soundtracks at Chudahs-Corner

Miyata, Mako
Miyata, Mako
Miyata, Mako
Miyata, Mako
Place of birth missing (living people)